Cryptomartus hindi is an extinct species of Carboniferous-aged trigonotarbid arachnid from Westphalian-aged coal strata in England and Germany.

3-D modeling
Scientists at Imperial College London created a detailed 3D computer model of the arachnid from fossils.

References

Trigonotarbids
Carboniferous arthropods of Europe
Fossil taxa described in 1911
Pridoli first appearances
Mississippian extinctions